Mark Ferrante (born May 30, 1961) is an American football coach. He is the head football coach at Villanova University, a position he has held since the 2017 season.

Head coaching record

References

External links
 Villanova profile

1961 births
Living people
American football quarterbacks
Lafayette Leopards football coaches
St. Lawrence Saints football players
St. Lawrence Saints football coaches
Villanova Wildcats football coaches
Wagner Seahawks football coaches